Edinburgh East is a burgh constituency of the House of Commons of the Parliament of the United Kingdom. It elects one Member of Parliament (MP) by the first past the post system of election.

In present form, the constituency was first used at the 2005 general election, but there was also an Edinburgh East constituency in existence from 1885 to 1997.

Boundaries 

Edinburgh East is now one of five constituencies covering the City of Edinburgh council area. All are entirely within the city council area. Prior to the 2005 general election, the city area was covered by six constituencies, with one straddling a boundary with another council area.

The Redistribution of Seats Act 1885 provided that the constituency was to consist of the Municipal Wards of Broughton, Calton, and Canongate, and so much of St. Leonard's Ward as lies to the north of a line drawn along the centres of East and West Richmond Streets.

In 1918 the constituency consisted of the "Burgh of Musselburgh and the Canongate and Portobello Municipal Wards of Edinburgh."

The Edinburgh East constituency, as defined in 2005, consists of areas formerly within the constituencies of Edinburgh East and Musselburgh, Edinburgh Central and Edinburgh South. It is largely a replacement for Edinburgh East and Musselburgh. Scottish Parliament constituencies retain the names and boundaries of the older Westminster constituencies.

As implied by the name, Edinburgh East covers an eastern portion of the City of Edinburgh, although it extends well into the city centre. It includes the areas of Craigmillar, Duddingston, Holyrood, Leith Links, Meadowbank, Milton, Mountcastle, Portobello, Prestonfield, Restalrig, Southside and Tollcross.

The constituency is predominantly urban.

The constituency of the 1885 to 1997 period was created when the Edinburgh constituency was abolished, in favour of four new constituencies: Edinburgh East, Edinburgh Central, Edinburgh South and Edinburgh West. Edinburgh Central was abolished in 2005. The South and West constituencies continue in use, with altered boundaries.

Constituency profile 
The seat covers the historic Old Town including notable buildings such as Edinburgh Castle, Holyrood Palace, the Royal Mile, St Giles' Cathedral and the Scottish Parliament building, as well as Portobello Beach. The constituency also houses the University of Edinburgh and has a significant student population.  Towards the south and east it also includes some of Edinburgh's more deprived areas such as the Craigmillar housing estate.

On average, residents are slightly wealthier and healthier than the UK average.

Members of Parliament

1885 to 1997

2005 to present

Election results

Elections in the 2010s

Elections in the 2000s

Election in the 1990s

Elections in the 1980s

Elections in the 1970s

Elections in the 1960s

Elections in the 1950s

Elections in the 1940s 

General Election 1939–40:

Another general election was required to take place before the end of 1940. The political parties had been making preparations for an election to take place from 1939 and by the end of this year, the following candidates had been selected; 
Labour: Frederick Pethick-Lawrence
Liberal: 
Unionist:

Elections in the 1930s

Elections in the 1920s

Elections in the 1910s

Elections in the 1900s

Elections in the 1890s

Elections in the 1880s

See also 
 Politics of Edinburgh

References
Specific

General
Craig, F. W. S. (1983). British parliamentary election results 1918-1949 (3 ed.). Chichester: Parliamentary Research Services. .

Westminster Parliamentary constituencies in Scotland
East
Constituencies of the Parliament of the United Kingdom established in 1885
Edinburgh East